The Big Ten Conference Baseball Coach of the Year is a baseball award given to the most outstanding baseball head coach in the Big Ten Conference.

Key

Winners

Winners by school

References

Awards established in 1988
Coach
NCAA Division I baseball conference coaches of the year